Talks at Google is a global, internal talks series hosted by Google. The talks are most often hosted for Google employees before being publicly released on their YouTube channel.

The program invites authors, scientists, actors, artists, filmmakers, and musicians to discuss their work. Most of the talks are uploaded to the YouTube channel.

The content can also be accessed in audio-only form using their podcast feed.

References

Google
YouTube channels

External links
Official website